
Artificial Intelligence: A General Survey, commonly known as the Lighthill report, is a scholarly article by James Lighthill, published in Artificial Intelligence: a paper symposium in 1973.

Published in 1973, it was compiled by Lighthill for the British Science Research Council as an evaluation of academic research in the field of artificial intelligence (AI). The report gave a very pessimistic prognosis for many core aspects of research in this field, stating that "In no part of the field have the discoveries made so far produced the major impact that was then promised".

It "formed the basis for the decision by the British government to end support for AI research in most British universities".  
While the report was supportive of research into the simulation of neurophysiological and psychological processes, it was "highly critical of basic research in foundational areas such as robotics and language processing". 
The report stated that AI researchers had failed to address the issue of combinatorial explosion when solving problems within real-world domains. That is, the report states that AI techniques may work within the scope of small problem domains, but the techniques would not scale up well to solve more realistic problems. The report represents a pessimistic view of AI that began after early excitement in the field.

The Science Research Council's decision to invite the report was partly a reaction to high levels of discord within the University of Edinburgh's Department of Artificial Intelligence, one of the earliest and biggest centres for AI research in the UK.

See also
 AI winter
 ALPAC report

References

External links
"Artificial Intelligence: A General Survey" James Lighthill: in Artificial Intelligence: a paper symposium, Science Research Council
Other Freddy II Robot Resources Includes a link to the 90-minute 1973 "Controversy" debate from the Royal Academy of Lighthill vs. Michie, McCarthy and Gregory in response to Lighthill's report to the British government.
The Lighthill Debate (1973) at YouTube: Part 1·2·3·4·5·6

1973 documents
1973 in science
1973 in the United Kingdom
Computer science papers
History of artificial intelligence
History of computing in the United Kingdom
Documents of the United Kingdom